Acleris caucasica is a species of moth of the family Tortricidae. It is found in the Alps of Europe, the eastern Baltic region, the northern parts of European Russia, Georgia, Primorsk and Amur Territory, northern China and Iran.

The wingspan is 12.5–15 mm.

Taxonomy
The species is alternatively placed as a subspecies of Acleris lacordairana.

References

Moths described in 1962
caucasica
Moths of Europe
Moths of Asia